Horace Edward Manners Fildes (5 October 1875–7 October 1937) was a New Zealand postmaster, book collector and bibliographer. He was born in Temuka, South Canterbury, New Zealand on 5 October 1875.

Fildes bequeathed nearly 2,000 volumes to the Victoria University College Library, which provided the basis of the New Zealand research materials in the J.C. Beaglehole Room.

References

1875 births
1937 deaths
New Zealand postmasters
New Zealand bibliographers
New Zealand book and manuscript collectors
People from Temuka